Mike's Election Guide 2008 is a 2008 political book by American filmmaker Michael Moore.

Overview
A comedic guide on how to vote in the 2008 American elections.

References

External links
C-Span Book Discussion on Mike's Election Guide 2008
Google Books

Books by Michael Moore
American non-fiction books
2008 non-fiction books
English-language books
Books about politics of the United States
Non-fiction books about elections
2008 United States presidential election in popular culture